Forum Mall Kochi is an upcoming mall under construction in the city of Kochi, Kerala, India. The Mall is promoted by one of the India's largest realty firm, the Prestige Group. Spanning over 10 acres of land, the mall has a total built up area of 10,60,000 sq ft and total retail space of 6,47,000 sq ft. The mall will have 6 major and 4 minor anchors including a Hypermarket, a Family Entertainment Centre, 20 restaurants, 11 food counters, 700 seater food court and 9 screen multiplex by PVR. A 40-room hotel space is also being developed in collaboration with Marriott International. 

The mall was scheduled to start its construction in 2009, however delayed due to global recession. The mall started its construction in April 2011, scheduled for a completion in 2022(not yet completed construction).

References

Shopping malls in Kochi
Buildings and structures under construction in India